Wahlert Catholic High School is a private Roman Catholic high school in Dubuque, Iowa, United States, in the Roman Catholic Archdiocese of Dubuque.

History
During a meeting on June 17, 1955, Archbishop Leo Binz and the pastors of the Dubuque Catholic parishes came to the conclusion that new high school facilities were needed to replace the existing high schools; Loras and St. Columbkille. These facilities were deteriorating, and also would not meet the demands of the post-World War II baby boom. As a result, it was decided to build a new central high school. In July, another meeting was held to determine a location for the new school. Harry Wahlert, who owned the Dubuque Packing Company, donated $250,000 towards the construction of the school. Area parishes were also asked to contribute to the funding. The total cost of construction was approximately $3,250,000.

A parcel across from the intersection of Kane and Chaney Streets near the west end of Dubuque was selected as the site for the school. When construction was finished, it measured over 222,000 square feet (20,600 m2). In February 1959, the archdiocese announced that the new school would be named in honor of Harry Wahlert. In August the school was officially opened, and the first classes began in September.
In 2005, construction commenced on the Mazzuchelli expansion, which utilized the west wing of Wahlert and a new addition next to the school. This facility opened in 2006, and now serves as the central middle school for all Dubuque residents in the Holy Family Catholic Schools.

Campus

Wahlert Catholic High School is located at 2005 Kane Street on the east side of Dubuque, Iowa. The three-story building and its grounds accommodate a chapel, running track, tennis courts, soccer field, and baseball field. The Wahlert portion of the campus occupies the eastern wings of the main building, while Mazzuchelli Middle School occupies the far western wing.

The main gymnasium was renovated in early 2013.

Athletics
Wahlert High School offers opportunities for participation in 19 interscholastic athletic activities. Many of these sports include freshman, sophomore, and junior varsity levels of competition. Sports currently offered to boys include football, cross country, basketball, wrestling, bowling, golf, tennis, track, soccer, baseball, and swimming (co-op with Dubuque Community Schools). Sports offered to girls include cross country, swimming, volleyball, basketball, bowling, golf, tennis, soccer, and softball. Wahlert's varsity athletic teams compete in the Mississippi Valley Conference.

The girls' volleyball team has won 18 state championships (1974, 1976, 1977, 1978, 1986, 1987, 1990, 1991, 1992, 1995, 1996,2000, 2001, 2002, 2003, 2004, 2005, 2016). 
The girls' cross country program won the 3A state title in 1981, 2009, 2010 and 2011
The boys' cross country team won the 3A state title 2003, 2004 and 2010.
Girls' golf 6-time State Champions (1966, 1969, 1971, 1972, 1973, 1974)
Girls' soccer has won four state titles  (1999, 2000, 2002, 2005) and the boys won in 2008 and 2012. 
Girls' track and field teams were state champions in 2011 and 2012.
Boys' tennis teams have won the longest run of titles in state history (6): 2004 through 2009, in addition to wins in 1983, 1989 and 2011.
 Girls' tennis were state champions in 1983, 1991, and 2009.  
Boys' bowling won 1A state titles in 2010 and 2013.
Girls' bowling were state champions in 2011 and 2013.  
Boys' basketball 5-time Class 3A State Champions (1980, 1981, 2008, 2014, 2015)

Performing arts
Wahlert has two competitive show choirs: "Impulse" (varsity) and "Impact" (prep). The school also hosts its own competition, dubbed the "Key City Classic".

Notable alumni
Kayla Banwarth - volleyball player
Bill Burbach - professional baseball player
Kevin Kunnert - NBA basketball player
Mac May - Volleyball player
Riley McCarron - NFL player
Michael Joseph Melloy - judge
Kate Mulgrew - actress
Bill Reiter - CBS Sports radio host
Travis Tranel - legislator

See also 
 List of high schools in Iowa

References

External links 
 Holy Family Catholic Schools Website

Education in Dubuque, Iowa
Educational institutions established in 1959
Roman Catholic Archdiocese of Dubuque
Catholic secondary schools in Iowa
Public high schools in Iowa
Schools in Dubuque County, Iowa
1959 establishments in Iowa